Dún Dealgan Motte is a motte and National Monument in Dundalk, Ireland.

Location

Dún Dealgan Motte is located immediately northwest of Dundalk and west of Mount Avenue, on a ridge overlooking the Castletown River.

History and archaeology

Motte

An ancient Gaelic Irish dún once stood here. Some legends claim the site as the birthplace of Cú Chulainn, and it is here that he bases himself in the Táin Bó Cúailgne. The Annals of the Four Masters places a battle here in 500 AD.

Early accounts merely call it Dealga, with dún only added after 1002, so it's possible that a fort was only built on the hill around that time. A Z-shaped souterrain,  in length, was also dug into the hill in the Gaelic period.

Motte-and-bailey castles were a primitive type of castle built after the Norman invasion, a mound of earth topped by a wooden palisade and tower. Dún Dealgan motte is believed to have been constructed by Bertram III de Verdun (c.1135–1192), with a bailey to the northwest. It was a stronghold of Hugh de Lacy, 1st Earl of Ulster in 1210, but he left it when pursued northwards by King John. On 14 October 1318, it was the site of the Battle of Faughart, where the Bruce campaign in Ireland ended with the death of Edward Bruce.

Folly

A local landowner named Patrick Byrne (often called a pirate, due to much of his wealth originating from smuggling) began to build a Gothic house atop the mount in 1780. It was damaged in the 1798 Rebellion, and only a castellated tower ("Byrne's Folly") remained.

The house was rebuilt in 1850 by Thomas Vesey Dawson as a country retreat, but fell into disrepair and was bought by the County Louth Archaeological and Historical Society to be used for a museum. It was further damaged in the revolutionary period (1919–23) when it was deliberately set on fire by armed men.

References

Archaeological sites in County Louth
National Monuments in County Louth
Motte-and-bailey castles